Below are the results of the first season of the Latin American Poker Tour (LAPT).  All currency amounts are in US dollars.

Results

LAPT Rio de Janeiro 
 Casino: Intercontinental Hotel 
 Buy-in: $2,500
 3-Day Event: Saturday, May 3, 2008 to Monday, May 5, 2008
 Number of buy-ins: 314
 Total Prize Pool: $785,000 
 Number of Payouts: 32
 Winning Hand:

LAPT San José 
 Casino: Ramada Plaza Herradura 
 Buy-in: $2,500 + $200
 3-Day Event: Thursday, May 22, 2008 to Saturday, May 24, 2008
 Number of buy-ins: 398
 Total Prize Pool: $965,150
 Number of Payouts: 32
 Winning Hand:

LAPT Punta del Este 
 Casino: Mantra Resort Spa Casino 
 Buy-in: $2,500 + $200
 3-Day Event: Thursday, August 7, 2008 to Saturday, August 9, 2008
 Number of buy-ins: 351
 Total Prize Pool: $851,175
 Number of Payouts: 32
 Winning Hand:

Notes

External links 
CardPlayer.com - Julien Nuijten Wins Latin American Poker Tour Rio

Latin American Poker Tour
2008 in poker